Lord George Thomas Beresford GCH, PC (12 February 1781 – 26 October 1839) was an Anglo-Irish soldier, courtier and Tory politician. He served as Comptroller of the Household from 1812 to 1830.

Background
Beresford was the fourth son of George Beresford, 1st Marquess of Waterford, by his wife Elizabeth Monck, daughter of Henry Monck. Henry Beresford, 2nd Marquess of Waterford and Lord John Beresford were his elder brothers and Lord Beresford and Sir John Beresford his half-brothers.

Military career
Beresford was appointed a cornet in the 13th Light Dragoons in April 1794, a lieutenant in the 111th Regiment of Foot in July 1794 and a captain in the 124th Regiment of Foot on 24 September 1794, from which he exchanged into the 88th Regiment of Foot on 29 July 1796. As a captain he served two years and eight months in the East Indies. He was promoted to the majority of the 6th Dragoon Guards on 3 December 1800 and to the lieutenant-colonelcy of Dillon's Regiment on 24 September 1803, from which he was removed to the 71st Regiment of Foot on 16 August 1804 and then to the 2nd Dragoon Guards on 30 July 1807. He was granted brevet rank as a colonel on 1 January 1812 and promoted to major-general 4 June 1814.

Political career
Beresford was returned to parliament for Londonderry in 1802. In 1812 he was returned for Coleraine, sworn of the Privy Council and appointed Comptroller of the Household under Lord Liverpool. In 1814 he was elected to parliament for County Waterford. He did not sit in parliament between 1826 and 1830 but nonetheless continued as Comptroller of the Household. He was once again returned to parliament for County Waterford in March 1830 and remained as Comptroller of the Household until the Whigs came to power under Lord Grey in late 1830. He continued to represent County Waterford in parliament until the 1831 general election.

Family
Beresford married Harriet Schutz, daughter of John Bacon Schutz, of Gillingham Hall, Suffolk, on 22 November 1808. They had three daughters:

Elizabeth Harriet Georgina (1810–1889), married Admiral Henry Eden.
Harriet Susan Isabella (d. 1859), married George Dunbar, MP for Belfast.
Caroline Susan Catherine (d. 1866), married Hon. Edward Kenyon, of Maesfen, Shropshire.

Beresford died in October 1839, aged 58. Lady George Beresford died in April 1860.

References

External links

1781 births
1839 deaths
18th-century Irish people
19th-century Irish people
People from County Waterford
Members of the Privy Council of the United Kingdom
Members of the Parliament of the United Kingdom for County Londonderry constituencies (1801–1922)
UK MPs 1802–1806
UK MPs 1806–1807
UK MPs 1807–1812
UK MPs 1812–1818
UK MPs 1818–1820
UK MPs 1820–1826
UK MPs 1830–1831
Younger sons of marquesses
George
Members of the Parliament of the United Kingdom for County Waterford constituencies (1801–1922)